Jaman South Municipal District is one of the twelve (12) districts in Bono Region, Ghana. Originally known as Jaman District on March 10, 1989, after being created from the former Berekum-Jaman District within the then-larger Brong-Ahafo Region. Later on, part of the district was split off to create Jaman North District on November 12, 2003; thus the remaining original part became Jaman South District. It was later upgraded to municipal status in November 2017, and renamed as Jaman South Municipal District. The municipality is located in the western part of Bono Region and has Drobo as its capital town.

It shares common borders with Berekum West District the south-east, Jaman North District to the North, Dormaa Municipal to the south and La Côte d'Ivoire in the west.

List of settlements

Sources

2003 establishments in Ghana
Districts of Bono Region